The Inklings were an informal literary discussion group associated with J. R. R. Tolkien and C. S. Lewis at the University of Oxford for nearly two decades between the early 1930s and late 1949.  The Inklings were literary enthusiasts who praised the value of narrative in fiction and encouraged the writing of fantasy. The best-known, apart from Tolkien and Lewis, were Charles Williams, and (although a Londoner) Owen Barfield.

Members

The more regular members of the Inklings, many of them academics at the University, included:

 Owen Barfield 
 Jack A. W. Bennett 
 Lord David Cecil 
 Nevill Coghill        
 Hugo Dyson 
 Adam Fox 
 Robert Havard 
 C. S. Lewis 
 Warren Lewis (C. S. Lewis's elder brother) 
 J. R. R. Tolkien
 Christopher Tolkien (J. R. R. Tolkien's son) 
 Charles Williams

More infrequent visitors included:

 James Dundas-Grant 
 Colin Hardie
 Gervase Mathew
 R. B. McCallum 
 Courtenay Edward Stevens
 John Wain 
 Charles Leslie Wrenn 

Guests included: 
 Roy Campbell 
 E. R. Eddison

Meetings

"Properly speaking," wrote Warren Lewis, "the Inklings was neither a club nor a literary society, though it partook of the nature of both. There were no rules, officers, agendas, or formal elections." As was typical for university groups in their time and place, the Inklings were all male. 
Readings and discussions of the members' unfinished works were the principal purposes of meetings.  Tolkien's The Lord of the Rings, Lewis's Out of the Silent Planet, and Williams's All Hallows' Eve were among the novels first read to the Inklings. Tolkien's fictional Notion Club (see "Sauron Defeated") was based on the Inklings.  Meetings were not all serious; the Inklings amused themselves by having competitions to see who could read the notoriously bad prose of Amanda McKittrick Ros for the longest without laughing.

The name was associated originally with a society of Oxford University's University College, initiated by the then undergraduate Edward Tangye Lean around 1931, for the purpose of reading aloud unfinished compositions.  The society consisted of students and dons, among them Tolkien and Lewis. When Lean left Oxford in 1933, the society ended, and Tolkien and Lewis transferred its name to their group at Magdalen College. On the association between the two 'Inklings' societies, Tolkien later said "although our habit was to read aloud compositions of various kinds (and lengths!), this association and its habit would in fact have come into being at that time, whether the original short-lived club had ever existed or not."

Until late 1949, Inklings readings and discussions were usually held on Thursday evenings in C. S. Lewis's rooms at Magdalen. The Inklings and friends were also known to gather informally on Tuesdays at midday at a local public house, The Eagle and Child, familiarly and alliteratively known in the Oxford community as The Bird and Baby, or simply The Bird. The publican, Charlie Blagrove, let Lewis and friends use his private parlour for privacy; the wall and door separating it from the public bar were removed in 1962. During the war years, beer shortages occasionally rendered the Eagle and Child unable to open and the group instead met at other pubs, including the White Horse and the Kings Arms. Later pub meetings were at The Lamb and Flag across the street, and in earlier years the Inklings also met irregularly in yet other pubs, but The Eagle and Child is the best known.

Legacy
The Marion E. Wade Center, located at Wheaton College, Illinois, is devoted to the work of seven British authors including four Inklings. Overall, the Wade Center has more than 11,000 volumes including first editions and critical works. Other holdings on the seven foremost authors (G. K. Chesterton, George MacDonald, and Inklings Owen Barfield, C. S. Lewis, J. R. R. Tolkien, Dorothy L. Sayers and Charles Williams) include letters, manuscripts, audio and video tapes, artwork, dissertations, periodicals, photographs, and related materials. Wheaton also has a creative writing critique group inspired by the Inklings called "WhInklings".

The Mythopoeic Society is a literary organization devoted to the study of mythopoeic literature, particularly the works of J. R. R. Tolkien, C. S. Lewis, and Charles Williams, founded by Glen GoodKnight in 1967 and incorporated as a non-profit organization in 1971.

The Inklings in fiction

In Swan Song (1947) by Edmund Crispin a discussion takes place between Professor Gervase Fen and others in the front parlour of the Eagle and Child.

The Late Scholar (2013) by Jill Paton Walsh is a sequel, set in 1951, to the Lord Peter Wimsey novels of Dorothy L. Sayers. Wimsey, now 17th Duke of Denver, is investigating a mystery in the fictional St Severin's College, Oxford with his friend Charles Parker, now an assistant chief constable.

Three of the founding members of the Inklings – Tolkien, Lewis, and Williams – are the main characters of James A. Owen's fantasy series, The Chronicles of the Imaginarium Geographica. (Warren Lewis and Hugo Dyson are recurring minor characters throughout the series.) The existence and founding of the organization are also alluded to in the third novel, The Indigo King. (The timeline of the books is different from the historical timeline at points, but these are dealt with part way through the series by the explanation that the books take place in a history alternative to our own.)

References

Sources
 
 
 
 
 
 
 
 
 .
 
Zaleski, Philip and Carol (2015). The Fellowship: The Literary Lives of the Inklings: J.R.R. Tolkien, C.S. Lewis, Owen Barfield, Charles Williams. New York: Farrar, Straus, and Giroux. .

External links 
 , peer-reviewed & academic.
 , a CS Lewis and Inklings resource blog.
 .
 .
 .
 .

 
English literary movements
1930s establishments in England
1950s disestablishments in England
Literary societies
History of the University of Oxford
Culture of the University of Oxford
C. S. Lewis
J. R. R. Tolkien
Writing circles
Arts organizations established in the 1930s
Literary_circles